Fyodorovsky District is the name of several administrative and municipal districts in Russia:
Fyodorovsky District, Republic of Bashkortostan, an administrative and municipal district of the Republic of Bashkortostan
Fyodorovsky District, Saratov Oblast, an administrative and municipal district of Saratov Oblast

See also
Fyodorovsky (disambiguation)

References